Berzin is a Russified form of the Latvian language surname Bērziņš. Individuals with the surname include:

Aleksandr Berzin (born 1946), Russian naval officer
Alexander Berzin (born 1944), Buddhist Scholar, translator and teacher focusing on the Tibetan tradition
Eduard Berzin (1894–1938), Latvian soldier and Chekist, remembered for setting up Dalstroy
Evgeni Berzin (born 1970), Russian cyclist who won the Giro d'Italia and Liège–Bastogne–Liège in 1994
Isaac Berzin (born 1967), chemical engineer who in 2001 founded GreenFuel Technologies Corporation
Reingold Berzin (1888–1938), Russian and Soviet military leader 
Jan Antonovich Berzin (1881–1938), Latvian village teacher, Soviet revolutionary, journalist and diplomat
Yan Karlovich Berzin (1889–1938), Soviet military commander and politician

See also
Bērziņš

Russian-language surnames
Surnames of Latvian origin